Marin Rozić (born 14 February 1983) is a Croatian former professional basketball player. Standing at 6'8" (2.03 m) in height and 220 pounds (100 kg) in weight, he played at the small forward position.

He spent most of his career with Cibona, playing 16 seasons with the club.

National team career
He was a member of the Croatia national team many years. 

He was a part of the national team at Eurobasket 2007 and Eurobasket 2009.

On 15 November 2018, Croatia head coach Dražen Anzulović invited him to the national team after 9 years, for the qualifications for the 2019 World Cup.

External links
 Adriatic League Profile
 Eurobasket Profile

1983 births
Living people
Croats of Bosnia and Herzegovina
ABA League players
Basket Livorno players
Basketball players at the 2008 Summer Olympics
Croatian men's basketball players
KK Cibona players
KK Zrinjevac players
Olympic basketball players of Croatia
Basketball players from Mostar
Small forwards
Croatian expatriate basketball people in Italy